Nosophora euryterminalis is a moth in the family Crambidae. It was described by George Hampson in 1918. It is found in Taiwan, China and Japan.

References

Moths described in 1918
Spilomelinae
Moths of Asia